Hotel Bringué is a countryhouse hotel in El Serrat, Ordino parish, Andorra. The hotel contains 110 rooms and its restaurant with a total capacity of 250 persons has views of the Valira North waterfalls.

References

External links
Website

Hotels in Andorra